Lyncina schilderorum, common names the sandy cowry or Schilder's cowry, is a species of sea snail, a cowry, a marine gastropod mollusk in the family Cypraeidae, the cowries. This species was named in honor of Franz and Maria Schilder, two German cowry biologists (hence the Latin name Schilderorum, meaning Schilders' ).

Description
The surface is smooth and shiny, their basic color is brown-orange, with 3-5 wide light blue transversal bands. The base is whitish or bluish, with fine white teeth. The shell is quite similar to Lyncina sulcidentata, Lyncina carneola and Lyncina ventriculus. In the living cowries mantle is whitish, with long tree-shaped sensorial papillae. Mantle and foot are well developed, with external antennae. The lateral flaps of the mantle may hide completely the shell surface and may be quickly retracted into the shell opening.

Distribution
This species occurs in the northern and central Pacific Ocean, in the seas along the Philippines,  Melanesia, Guam, Micronesia, Polynesia, Tuamotu Islands and Hawaii, excluding the Galapagos.

Habitat
At night they can be found on the reef or small caves, feeding on sponges or corals.

References
 Lorenz F. & Hubert A. (2000) A guide to worldwide cowries. Edition 2. Hackenheim: Conchbooks. 584 pp

External links
  Biolib
 

Cypraeidae
Gastropods described in 1939